Aika is the second solo studio album by a Finnish singer-songwriter Aki Sirkesalo. Released by Sony Music Entertainment in 1996, the album peaked at number three on the Finnish Albums Chart.

Track listing

Chart performance

References

1996 albums
Aki Sirkesalo albums
Pop rock albums by Finnish artists
Sony Music albums